3 Ninjas Knuckle Up is a 1993 American martial arts comedy film taking place in between 3 Ninjas and 3 Ninjas Kick Back. The film was directed by Shin Sang-ok, using the pseudonym "Simon Sheen". The film was shot in 1992, the same year the first film was released, but was not released until 1995.

Plot
13-year-old Rocky, 12-year-old Colt, 8-year-old Tum Tum defend "Truth, Justice and the American Way", once more - this time, protecting a Native American village and the rest of society against a Toxic Waste Company.

During a summer, the boys are staying with Grandpa Mori when they witness the Native Americans protesting against the waste industry and the fight soon breaks out while Mori and the boys are ordered to drive away by the authorities. The next day, Colt and Tum-Tum encounters a same group of men led by J.J. harassing and assaulting a girl named Jo from the protest at the pizza parlor after she demands them about her father's whereabouts. Colt, Tum-Tum and Rocky step in to protect her by fighting them and getting cheered on by the admiring customers. After fending off the men with their martial arts techniques, they are praised as heroes which gives them big heads. However, the boys are put to work by Mori and the owner of the pizza parlor to work off damages from their fight. Mori tries to teach them a lesson in humility, but the reference of a flower blooming goes over their heads. Jo comes to the boys later at the pizza parlor and explains that the men are under the employ of Jack Harding, an industrialist who is illegally dumping toxic contents into the Native American reserve. Without proof, they can do nothing. Jo's father named Charlie had gone to investigate, but he had not returned. Colt, who is seemingly attracted to Jo, agrees that they will help and find her father. The boys follow and sneaks into Jack's waste management, overheard his conversation with the Mayor about corruption and founds Charlie imprisoned. The boys managed to fight of the some of Jack's men and escape as they report Jo. That night, they mount an escape plan for her father, which is successful. They spend the night celebrating with the tribe and getting thanks for helping them. During the dance, Jack and his men attack them once again until the boys and Native Americans fight them off with the help of Mori, who suspicious about his grandsons.

Charlie and his family prepares and appeals for a court date with significant evidence to put Jack out of business for good. Soon, Jack arranges to have Jo kidnapped by the Bikers and convince her father to falsify his evidence, which he has no other choice for her safety.

Rocky and his brothers get the information to find where Jo is being held hostage, drive out to rescue her and return before the court case is dismissed and all of Charlie's hard work accounts for nothing at all. After fighting through a small band of armed bikers at the abandoned town, they found Jo and return her to the court house. The boys arrive and fight off Jack's men and the Sheriffs as Jo arrives to the courtroom just before her father about to turn the real evidence over to Jack. Charlie punches Jack, admits his mistake and hands the real evidence to the EPA representative who signifies the case and shuts down the company producing the waste.

As the boys leave the court, Jo and her family looks around for the 'heroes' of the day, but they are nowhere to be found. Returning to Mori's home, Rocky, Colt and Tum-Tum realizes the point of Mori's earlier lesson: that a flower is content to bloom quietly, without clamoring for attention. The film ends with Grandpa Mori and the boys somersaulting into the air in victory.

Cast

Reception
The film received mostly negative reviews.

On Metacritic, 3 Ninjas Knuckle Up holds 39 out of a 100 based on 6 critics, indicating "generally unfavorable reviews".

The film was nominated for Worst Sequel and The Sequel Nobody Was Clamoring For at the 1995 Stinkers Bad Movie Awards, but lost to Ace Ventura: When Nature Calls and Halloween 6: The Curse of Michael Myers, respectively.

Despite negativity, Michael Sauter of Entertainment Weekly gave the film a "B−" grade.

References

External links
 
 

1993 action comedy films
1993 martial arts films
Knuckle Up
American action comedy films
1990s English-language films
Environmental films
Films about brothers
Films directed by Shin Sang-ok
American martial arts comedy films
Ninja films
TriStar Pictures films
American children's comedy films
1990s American films